Susanne Börnike (born 13 August 1968 in Brandenburg an der Havel) is a German former swimmer who competed at the 1988 Summer Olympics in 200 metre breaststroke.

References

1968 births
Living people
Sportspeople from Brandenburg an der Havel
German female swimmers
East German female breaststroke swimmers
Olympic swimmers of East Germany
Swimmers at the 1988 Summer Olympics
European Aquatics Championships medalists in swimming